Golu is the festive display of dolls and figurines in South India during the autumn festive season, particularly around the multiday Navaratri (Dussehra, Dasara) festival of Hinduism. These displays are typically thematic, narrating a legend from a Hindu text to court life, weddings, everyday scenes, and miniature kitchen utensils. They are also known as golu, Gombe Habba, Bommai golu, or Bommala Koluvu.

Each displayed item in a golu display is sometimes called a golu doll or equivalent. These are typically made by rural artisans from clay and wooden materials then brightly painted. They are generally arranged in an odd number of padis (tiers or steps) to tell a story. Goddess-related themes are common, along with developments such as anticipated wedding within the family and of friends. During the golu display season, families and neighbors visit each other with gifts to view and chit-chat over the golu display, share festive foods, and sometimes play music or sing devotional songs together. Major Hindu temples such as the Meenakshi Temple in Madurai, arrange elaborate golu displays each year for Navaratri.

Etymology
Bommai golu in Tamil means Doll Decoration. Bommala Koluvu in Telugu means Court of Toys and Gombe Habba means Doll Festival in Kannada. It is a part of the annual Dasara-Vijayadasami Hindu festival where young girls and women display dolls, figurine, court life, everyday scenes along with the divine presence of the goddesses Saraswati, Parvati and Lakshmi in the Tamil, Kannada, and Telugu households during Navaratri, the nine nights.

Description

On the first day of Navaratri, following Ganapati puja, a welcoming ritual is performed for goddesses Saraswati, Durga, and Lakshmi by a Hindu ritual called Kalasa Aavahanam which is performed by an elderly male or female of the family at an auspicious time (muhurtam). This is then followed by building a rack of odd-numbered shelves of golu (or Padi) (usually 3, 5, 7, 9, or 11), set up using wooden planks. After the steps have been covered with fabric it is then adorned with various dolls, figurines and toys according to their size, with the deities at the top.

The dolls are predominantly displayed with depictions from Hindu mythological texts, court life, royal procession, ratha yatra, weddings, baby showers, everyday scenes, miniature kitchen utensils, anything a little girl would have played with. It is a traditional practice to have wooden figurines of the bride and groom together, called 'Marapacchi Bommai' or 'Pattada Gombe', usually made of sandalwood, teak or rosewood or dried coconut and decorated with new clothes each year before being displayed on the golu. In southern India, bride is presented with 'Marapacchi Bommai' during the wedding by her parents as part of wedding trousseau to initiate the yearly tradition of 'Navaratri golu' in her new home with her husband.  These dolls come as couples dressed in their wedding attire, depicting husband and wife symbolizing prosperity and fertility and the start of the bride's golu collection. Display figurines are passed on from one generation to another as heirloom, and are often several generations old. In the old Kingdom of Mysore, 'Pattada Gombe' is also believed to be a tribute to the kings of the Wodeyar dynasty who ruled of the region for around 600 years.

In the evenings, women within the neighborhood invite each other to visit their homes to view the golu displays; they also exchange gifts and sweets.  A Kuthuvilakku lamp is lit, in the middle of a decorated rangoli, while devotional hymns and shlokas are chanted. After performing the puja, the food items that have been prepared are offered to the Goddess and then to the guests. The first 3 days of the festival are dedicated to Durga, then the next 3 days dedicated to Lakshmi and finally, the last 3 days are dedicated to Saraswati.

On the 9th day, Saraswati Puja, special pujas are offered to goddess Saraswati. Books and musical instruments are placed in the puja and worshipped as a source of knowledge.

The 10th day, Vijayadashami, is regarded by some to be the most auspicious day of all. It was the day Hindus believe the asura Mahishasura was finally destroyed by Durga. It is regarded to mark a new and prosperous beginning. Later, on the evening of Vijayadashami, one of the doll from the display is symbolically put to sleep, and the Kalasha is moved a bit towards North to mark the end of that year's Navaratri golu display. Prayers are offered to thank deities for the successful completion of that year's Navaratri festival and with hope of a successful one the next year. Then the steps are dismantled and the dolls are packed up for the next year.

Significance
Golu also has a significant connection with the agricultural and handicrafts professions in India. Besides the economic aspect of the festival, it is an important occasion for socializing. During this season relatives and friends in south India make it a point to visit each other's homes. This is also a very important occasion that promotes creative expression for women and for the family to work together on an aesthetic aspect.

Gallery

See also
Navaratri
Vijayadashami
Hinamatsuri
Marapachi Dolls

References

External links 
Navarathri golu / golu Dolls Showcase and Display - Photos

Hindu festivals
Tamil festivals
Religious festivals in India
Religious festivals in Sri Lanka
September events
October events